Hajj is a 2013 Indian Kannada language directed by and starring Nikhil Manjoo in the lead role, alongside Manasa Joshi and Geethamani who appear in pivotal roles.

At the 2013 Karnataka State Film Awards, the film won three awards – Best Film, Best Actor (Nikhil Manjoo) and Best Story (Srilalithe). In December 2014, at the 7th Bengaluru International Film Festival, the film was awarded the Best Kannada Film.

Cast
 Nikhil Manjoo as Altaf
 Manasa Joshi as Hazira
 Geethamani as Fatima

References

2013 films
2010s Kannada-language films